Tazehabad-e Chaf (also Romanized as Tāzehābād-e Chāf; also known as Tāzehābād) is a village in Chaf Rural District, in the Central District of Langarud County, Gilan Province, Iran. At the 2006 census, its population was 523, in 142 families.

References 

Populated places in Langarud County